The 2002 JPMorgan Chase Open was a women's tennis tournament played on outdoor hard courts. It was part of the 2002 WTA Tour. It was the 29th edition of the tournament and took place in Manhattan Beach, California, United States, from August 5 through August 11, 2002. Twelfth-seeded Chanda Rubin won the singles title and earned $93,000 first-prize money.

Finals

Singles

 Chanda Rubin defeated  Lindsay Davenport, 5–7, 7–6(7–5), 6–3

Doubles

 Kim Clijsters /  Jelena Dokić defeated  Daniela Hantuchová /  Ai Sugiyama, 6–3, 6–3

References

External links
 ITF tournament edition details
 Tournament draws

2002 WTA Tour
LA Women's Tennis Championships
2002 in American tennis
2002 in sports in California